Haematologica is a monthly, peer reviewed, scientific journal, published by the Ferrata Storti Foundation. The editor in chief is Dr. Jacob M. Rowe (Rambam Medical Center, Haifa, Israel). The focus of Haematologica is all topics related to experimental and clinical hematology, which results in a multidisciplinary scope. The National Library of Medicine ID  number (NLM ID) is 0417435.

Hematology is the study of blood, blood-forming tissues, and blood diseases.

Blood diseases affect the production of blood and its components, such as blood cells, hemoglobin, blood proteins, the mechanism of coagulation, etc.

Society publication
Haematologica is the official publication for the following societies:

Italian Society of Hematology (SIE)
Italian Society of Experimental Hematology (SIES)

Founding and merger
In 1920 by Adolfo Ferrata founded Haematologica. In 2005 Haematologica merged with The Hematology Journal.

Peer review policy
The peer review policy of Haematologica is for all submitted manuscripts to be critically assessed by either external or in-house experts. The peer review process (policy) is in accordance with the International Committee of Medical Journal Editors (ICMJE).

Abstracting and indexing
With a 2020 impact factor of 9.941, from Journal Citation Reports, Haematologica ranked 8th out of 76 journals in the "Hematology" category and it is also indexed in the following databases:

 Pubmedcentral 
 Science Citation Index 
 SciSearch
 Current Contents – Clinical Medicine 
 Current Contents – Life Sciences 
 BIOSIS Previews

References

External links
Home page
Ferrata Storti Foundation

Hematology journals
English-language journals